Lyudmila Borisova (born 3 August 1966) is a retired Soviet and Russian runner who specialized in the 3000 metres.

She holds the current world record in the rarely contested 4 x 800 metres relay (7:50.17 minutes with Nadezhda Olizarenko, Lyubov Gurina and Irina Podyalovskaya).

International competitions

References

1966 births
Living people
Russian female middle-distance runners
Russian female long-distance runners
Soviet female middle-distance runners
Soviet female long-distance runners
Olympic female middle-distance runners
Olympic athletes of Russia
Athletes (track and field) at the 1996 Summer Olympics
Competitors at the 1994 Goodwill Games
Universiade medalists in athletics (track and field)
Universiade gold medalists for the Soviet Union
Competitors at the 1991 Summer Universiade
Medalists at the 1983 Summer Universiade
World Athletics Championships athletes for the Soviet Union
Russian Athletics Championships winners
Soviet Athletics Championships winners
World Athletics record holders (relay)